Michael Ennis (born 16 March 1984) is an Australian sports commentator for Fox League and former professional rugby league footballer of Irish descent. A New South Wales State of Origin representative , he played for the Canterbury-Bankstown Bulldogs, Brisbane Broncos, St George Illawarra Dragons, Newcastle Knights and the Cronulla-Sutherland Sharks, with whom he won the 2016 NRL premiership. and has been described as "one of the game's most hated players."

Playing career

Newcastle Knights
Ennis made his NRL debut for Newcastle in 2003. After a single game in 2003 he played 19 games during the 2004 NRL season for the Knights.

St. George Illawarra Dragons
In the 2005 NRL season's finals series Ennis was kicking goals for the St. George Illawarra Dragons as they went to within one match of the grand final but lost to eventual premiers, the Wests Tigers.

Brisbane Broncos

Ennis’s first season at the Brisbane club, in 2006, was cut short by a knee injury suffered in round 5 against the South Sydney Rabbitohs at Suncorp Stadium. While changing direction, Ennis snapped his anterior cruciate ligament and required a full knee reconstruction. Ennis missed the rest of the season, and subsequently, the premiership win in October. As 2006 NRL Premiers, the Brisbane Broncos travelled to England to face 2006 Super League champions, St Helens R.F.C. in the 2007 World Club Challenge. Ennis played from the interchange bench in the Broncos' 14-18 loss.

In the 2007 NRL season, Ennis made a return to first grade but was forced to work for his place in the side as a result of the good form of Shaun Berrigan at hooker.  After some appearances from the interchange bench earlier in the season, Ennis was trialled at halfback during the final stages of Brisbane's round 10 loss to the Manly-Warringah Sea Eagles.  He was retained in this position in the ensuing games with some success.

The 2008 NRL season saw Ennis reach the best form of his time at the Brisbane club. With stiff competition from recruit PJ Marsh, Ennis cemented a spot as the starting hooker and guided the Broncos to some impressive early victories.

In June 2008, Ennis signed a three-year deal to join Canterbury-Bankstown in 2009, joining a list of players to leave the Broncos. This was to be his 4th NRL club at 24 years of age.

Canterbury-Bankstown Bulldogs

Ennis joined the Canterbury-Bankstown Bulldogs from Brisbane for the 2009 NRL season.

He was selected for Country in the City vs Country match on 8  May 2009.

Ennis made his State of Origin debut for New South Wales in Game III of the 2009 series, replacing bitter rival Robbie Farah who was dropped. Ennis made an impact in his first game as the Blues won a dead rubber match, 28-16 with Ennis landing three goals from three attempts.  At club level, Ennis played 25 games for Canterbury in his first season there as they finished second on the table and qualified for the finals.  Ennis played in Canterbury's preliminary final defeat against arch rivals Parramatta at ANZ Stadium.

He filled the full-time goal-kicking role at Canterbury-Bankstown in 2010, replacing Hazem El Masri, who retired in 2009. However, he was replaced by specialist Bryson Goodwin.

Ennis played in all three games in 2010 State of Origin series, all resulting in losses. In the third match, Ennis was blamed by some for costing NSW victory when he gave away a penalty by punching Queensland's Nate Myles with six minutes to go (NSW at the time were leading 18-13). There have since been calls for Ennis not to play for New South Wales ever again, but, despite this, he was selected for all three games the following series, also lost.

In the three-year period from the start of 2008 season, Ennis was penalised in games 58 times, the 2nd most of any player in the NRL behind Anthony Watmough. In 2011, he was penalised 17 times in his 12 appearances. In 2012, he was penalised 20 times in 20 games.

In February, 2011, Ennis signed a new three-year contract with Canterbury. Then-coach Kevin Moore said, "Mick is the kind of player that any head coach would love to have in his side. He leaves nothing to chance, he's a natural leader, is about the fittest bloke in the team and he gives us outstanding direction on and off the field."

Ennis played in 26 games in 2012 as Canterbury won the Minor Premiership.  He missed only one game as Canterbury-Bankstown made the 2012 NRL Grand Final against Melbourne. However, he failed to score a try for the year.  Canterbury would go on to lose the final 14-4 at ANZ Stadium.

Around half way through the 2014 NRL season, Ennis signed on with the Cronulla-Sutherland Sharks for what was likely to be the last two years of his career.

In Canterbury's Preliminary Final win over Penrith Panthers in September 2014, Ennis suffered a foot injury, ruling him out of the 2014 NRL Grand Final, with the captaincy for the Grand Final passed to James Graham and Trent Hodkinson meaning that Ennis had played his last game for Canterbury-Bankstown.

Cronulla-Sutherland Sharks
In 2015, he joined the Cronulla-Sutherland Sharks.  Ennis played in Game 3 of the 2015 State of Origin series as Robbie Farah withdrew due to injury.  In the 2015 NRL season, Ennis played 25 games for Cronulla as they qualified for the finals.  Ennis played in the club's 39-0 elimination final loss against North Queensland.

In 2016, he announced he would retire at the end of the season. He finished the season on a high note, winning the 2016 NRL Grand Final in his last game.

Post playing career

Media
Ennis works for Fox Sports coverage of rugby league.

References

External links

Cronulla Sharks profile
NRL profile

1984 births
Living people
Australian people of Irish descent
Australian rugby league coaches
Australian rugby league commentators
Australian rugby league players
Brisbane Broncos players
Canterbury-Bankstown Bulldogs players
Country New South Wales Origin rugby league team players
Cronulla-Sutherland Sharks players
New South Wales Rugby League State of Origin players
Newcastle Knights players
NRL All Stars players
Prime Minister's XIII players
Rugby league hookers
Rugby league players from Coffs Harbour
St. George Illawarra Dragons players
Valentine-Eleebana Red Devils players
Fox Sports (Australian TV network) people